National Route 850 (N850) is a , two-four lane, circumferential national secondary route that forms part of the Philippine highway network. It connects the whole island of Bohol. The route is composed of Tagbilaran North Road from Tagbilaran to Trinidad and Tagbilaran East Road from Trinidad to Tagbilaran again.

History

Route description

Tagbilaran to Trinidad 
The route starts as Tagbilaran North Road. After reaching Trinidad, the road ends in a three-way intersection with Loay Interior Road and Tagbilaran East Road.

Trinidad to Tagbilaran 
The route continues as Tagbilaran East Road. After reaching tagbilaran again it ends in the kilometer 0 of Bohol.

Incidents 

 This highway had many bridges and sections of Tagbilaran North Road and Tagbilaran East Road damaged during the 2013 Bohol earthquake. A few bridges were reconstructed with the Mabey Compact 200.
 On April 27, 2022, the old bridge over the Loboc River in Loay collapsed, killing 4 people and injuring 15. The bridge was damaged during the 2013 earthquake and still being used while a new replacement bridge was under construction next to it. One possible cause was the stationary traffic on the bridge that exceeded its capacity.

References 

Roads in Bohol